Akashaditya Lama (born 9 March 1977) is a television screenwriter and filmmaker

Career
His first stint with film writing was with the film Lahore, directed by Sanjay Puran Singh Chauhan. Lama has co-written Chauhan's next directorial venture Chanda Mama Door Ke and Tauba Tera Jalwa. He also wrote and co-produced the Hindi play Mohenjodaro  . Lama directed his first short film in 2012 titled Cigarette Ki Tarah, and Nani Teri Morni

Apart from directing plays Lama has been a member Central Board of Film Certification and the 52nd International Film Festival of India.

Television

References

1977 births
Hindi-language film directors
Indian male screenwriters
Living people
People from Ranchi
21st-century Indian film directors